Memory of Water is a 1994 Spanish-Argentine drama film directed by Héctor Fáver. It was screened in the Un Certain Regard section at the 1992 Cannes Film Festival.

Cast
 Isabel Abad
 Nicolás Alvarez
 Héctor Fáver
 Ana Llobet
 Cristina Peralta
 Boris Rotenstein
 Jaume Viada

References

External links

1994 films
1990s Spanish-language films
1994 drama films
Films directed by Héctor Fáver
Argentine black-and-white films
Spanish black-and-white films
Holocaust films
1990s Argentine films
1990s Spanish films